Muhammad Khalid Sayed (born 17 December 1984) is a South African politician and youth activist who serves as a Member of the Western Cape Provincial Parliament for the official opposition African National Congress (ANC). He took office as an MPP in May 2019 and is also the ANC's deputy chief whip and shadow MEC for Education. He is also the chair of the provincial branch of the ANC Youth League. Elected in 2015, he has since been re-elected in 2018.

References

External links
Muhammad Khalid Sayed – People's Assembly
Hon Khalid Sayed – wcpp
Muhammad Khalid Sayed – The Daily Maverick

Living people
1984 births
African National Congress politicians
People from the Western Cape
Members of the Western Cape Provincial Parliament